"'Jean Francois Feupa Mkamwa"', known as Frank Parapara (born October 11, 1991, in Foumban) is a Cameroonian footballer who plays as striker. The bomber, in French "Le Bombadier", was a nickname given by his fans.

Club career

Cameroon 
Parapara started his career in 2007 with AS Kadey of Batouri, a second division club in Cameroon Elite Two, where he provided 10 goals as a starter and was appointed best passer with 12 assists and best scored. The year after he played for Levant FC of Bertoua (Cameroon) a Regional Championship, where he scored 9 goals.

Oman Professional League

Al Bashaer Club 
In January 2012 he commenced playing in the Al Bashaer Club  in Oman where he scored 10 goals.

Ahli Sidab Club 
He joined Ahli Sidab Club with a record of 12 goals scored across 20 matches.

Bahla Club 

Feupa moved to Bahla Club in 2014–2015. The club was looking for a player who would assist them in a move to division one. He scored 18 goals in 20 games, and gave the club the OMAN championship Second League Winner as well as being recognised as best scoring and best player.
2014

Al Nahda Club 

In January 2016, Parapara joined the Al-Nahda Club (Oman) scoring 22 goals during his time there.

Saudi Professional League

Al-Orobah FC 
Frank Parapara started the new season with Al-Orobah FC, a professional club in Saudi Arabia.

International career 
In 2012, he was preselected to join the Cameroon Young national team
In 2014  he was  preselected to join the Cameroon national under-23 football team

Honor 
2007 Best Scored MTN Elite Two with 10 goals
2015 Best scored OMAN championship Second League with 18 goals 
2016 Best scored OMAN championship Premier League with 15 goals 
2015 OMAN championship Second League Winner 
2017 OMAN Oman Professional League Cup winner 
2017 OMAN Oman First Division League Best scored with 14 Goals

Gallery

References

External links
http://press-sport.com/oman-jean-francois-feupa-fixe-ses-objectifs/
http://www.newsexpressngr.com/news/detail.php?news=4043
http://www.goalzz.com/?c=11030
https://www.youtube.com/watch?v=UBd4HqOyp2M
https://www.youtube.com/watch?v=rj-EQ_87y_I
http://www.goalzz.com/?c=11030
http://www.opl.om/league_game/878
http://www.goalzz.com/main.aspx?c=13057&scorers=true

1991 births
Living people
Cameroonian footballers
Oman Professional League players
Ahli Sidab Club players
Bahla Club players
Al-Nahda Club (Oman) players
Khor Fakkan Sports Club players
Al-Orobah FC players
Dhofar Club players
UAE First Division League players
Saudi First Division League players
Expatriate footballers in Oman
Cameroonian expatriate sportspeople in Oman
Expatriate footballers in the United Arab Emirates
Cameroonian expatriate sportspeople in Saudi Arabia
Expatriate footballers in Saudi Arabia
Cameroonian expatriate sportspeople in the United Arab Emirates
Association football forwards